Dynamic pricing, also referred to as surge pricing, demand pricing, or time-based pricing, is a pricing strategy in which businesses set flexible prices for products or services based on current market demands. Businesses are able to change prices based on algorithms that take into account competitor pricing, supply and demand, and other external factors in the market. Dynamic pricing is a common practice in several industries such as hospitality, tourism, entertainment, retail, electricity, and public transport. Each industry takes a slightly different approach to dynamic pricing based on its individual needs and the demand for the product.

History of dynamic pricing
Dynamic pricing has been the norm for most of human history. Traditionally, two parties would negotiate a price for a product based on a variety of factors, including who was involved, stock levels, time of day, and more. Store owners relied heavily on experienced shopkeepers to manage this process, and these shopkeepers would negotiate the price for every single product in a store. Shopkeepers needed to know everything they could about a product, including the purchase price, stock levels, market demand, and more, to succeed in their jobs and bring profit to the store.

As retail expanded in the Industrial Revolution, storeowners faced the challenge of scaling this traditional haggling system. As assortments expanded and the number of stores grew, it quickly became impossible for shopkeepers to keep up with the store. The negotiation model quickly proved inefficient within an economy of scale.

The invention of the price tag in the 1870s presented a solution: one price for every person. This idea harkened back to a traditional Quaker idea of fairness: Quaker store owners had long employed a fixed-price system in the name of egalitarianism. By charging the same price of all shoppers, Quakers created a system that was fair for all, regardless of shoppers' wealth or status.

Unlike the Quakers, who used fixed pricing as a way to maintain fairness, retailers used fixed pricing to reduce the need for highly skilled shopkeepers and smooth out the shopping experience within a store. The price tag made it easier to train shopkeepers, reduced wait time at checkout, and improved the overall customer experience. This fixed-price model with price tags would dominate retail and commerce for years to come. The current concept of dynamic pricing would emerge anew in the 1980s, aided by innovations in technology and computerized automation.

Dynamic pricing in air transportation
Dynamic pricing re-appeared in the market at large in the 1980s airline industry in the United States. Before the 1980s, the airline industry's seat prices were heavily regulated by the United States government, but a change in legislation during the decade gave airlines control over their prices. Companies invested millions of dollars to develop computer programs that would adjust prices automatically based on known variables like departure time, destination, season, events, and more.

After seeing the success of dynamic pricing in selling airline seats, many other verticals within the travel and tourism industry adopted the practice. Dynamic pricing is now the norm for hotels, car rentals, and more, and consumers have largely accepted the practice as commonplace. The practice is now moving beyond the travel and tourism industry into other fields.

Dynamic pricing in rideshare services
The most recent innovation in dynamic pricing—and the one felt most by consumers—is the rise of dynamic pricing in rideshare apps like Uber. Uber's “Surge Pricing” model, where riders pay more for a trip during peak travel times, began as a way to incentivize drivers to stay out later in Boston, according to Bill Gurley, former board member of Uber. The incentive worked, and the number of drivers on the road in the early morning hours increased by 70%-80%, and the number of unfilled Uber requests plummeted.

Dynamic pricing today
Dynamic pricing has become commonplace in many industries for a variety of reasons.

Hospitality
Time-based pricing is the standard method of pricing in the tourism industry. Higher prices are charged during the peak season, or during special event periods. In the off-season, hotels may charge only the operating costs of the establishment, whereas investments and any profit are gained during the high season (this is the basic principle of long-run marginal cost pricing: see also long run and short run).

Hotels and other players in the hospitality industry use dynamic pricing to adjust the cost of rooms and packages based on the supply and demand needs at a particular moment. The goal of dynamic pricing in this industry is to find the highest price that consumers are willing to pay. Another name for dynamic pricing in the industry is demand pricing. This form of price discrimination is used to try to maximize revenue based on the willingness to pay of different market segments. It features price increases when demand is high and decreases to stimulate demand when it is low. Having a variety of prices based on the demand at each point in the day makes it possible for hotels to generate more revenue by bringing in customers at the different price points they are willing to pay.

Transportation
Airlines change prices often depending on the day of the week, time of day, and the number of days before the flight. For airlines, dynamic pricing factors in different components such as: how many seats a flight has, departure time, and average cancellations on similar flights. A 2022 study in Econometrica estimated that dynamic pricing was beneficial for "early-arriving, leisure consumers at the expense of late-arriving, business travelers. Although dynamic pricing ensures seat availability for business travelers, these consumers are then charged higher prices. When aggregated over markets, welfare is higher under dynamic pricing than under uniform pricing."

Congestion pricing is often used in public transportation and road pricing, where a higher price at peak periods is used to encourage more efficient use of the service or time-shifting to cheaper or free off-peak travel.  For example, the San Francisco Bay Bridge charges a higher toll during rush hour and on the weekend, when drivers are more likely to be traveling. This is an effective way to boost revenue when demand is high, while also managing demand since drivers unwilling to pay the premium will avoid those times.  The London congestion charge discourages automobile travel to Central London during peak periods.  The Washington Metro and Long Island Rail Road charge higher fares at peak times. 

The tolls on the Custis Memorial Parkway vary automatically according to the actual number of cars on the roadway, and at times of severe congestion can reach almost $50.

Dynamic pricing is also used by Uber and Lyft. Uber's system for "dynamically adjusting prices for service" measures supply (Uber drivers) and demand (passengers hailing rides by use of smartphones), and prices fares accordingly.

Professional sports
Some professional sports teams use dynamic pricing structures to boost revenue. Dynamic pricing is particularly important in baseball because MLB teams play around twice as many games as some other sports and in much larger venues.

Sports that are outdoors have to factor weather into pricing strategy, in addition to the date of the game, date of purchase, and opponent. Tickets for a game during inclement weather will sell better at a lower price; conversely, when a team is on a winning streak, fans will be willing to pay more.

Dynamic pricing was first introduced to sports by a start-up software company from Austin, Texas, Qcue and Major League Baseball club San Francisco Giants. The San Francisco Giants implemented a pilot of 2,000 seats in the View Reserved and Bleachers and moved on to dynamically pricing the entire venue for the 2010 season. Qcue currently works with two-thirds of Major League Baseball franchises,  not all of which have implemented a full dynamic pricing structure, and for the 2012 postseason, the San Francisco Giants, Oakland Athletics, and St. Louis Cardinals became the first teams to dynamically price postseason tickets. While behind baseball in terms of adoption, the National Basketball Association, National Hockey League, and NCAA have also seen teams implement dynamic pricing. Outside of the U.S., it has since been adopted on a trial basis by some clubs in the Football League. Scottish Premier League club Heart of Midlothian introduced dynamic pricing for the sale of their season tickets in 2012, but supporters complained that they were being charged significantly more than the advertised price.

Retail
Retail is the next frontier for dynamic pricing. As e-commerce grows in importance and the size of assortments expands, retailers are turning to software to help track product prices and make pricing updates.

Retailers, and online retailers, in particular, adjust the price of their products according to competitors, time, traffic, conversion rates, and sales goals. Dynamic pricing is quickly becoming a best practice within the retail industry to help stores manage these factors in a fast-paced market. Dynamic pricing software allows retailers to easily understand what happens in their assortments at a glance and act proactively on market changes.

Some retailers will build their own dynamic pricing software, but many more will outsource to a software vendor. Retailers in all categories use dynamic pricing software including sporting goods, beauty, fashion, do-it-yourself and hardware, baby and family, auto parts, home care, fast-moving consumer goods (FMCGs), and more. Dynamic pricing can even be used by brick and mortar stores with the help of electronic shelf labels (ESLs).

Theme parks 
Theme Parks have also recently adopted this pricing model in hopes to boost sales. Disneyland and Disney World adapted this practice in 2016, and Universal Studios followed suit. It needs to be pointed out that this pricing model resembles price discrimination more than dynamic pricing, however for the sake of uniformity is included.

Since the supply of parks is limited and new rides cannot be added based on the surge of demand, the model followed by theme parks in regards to dynamic pricing resembles that followed by the hotel industry. During summertime, when demand is rather inelastic, the parks charge high prices due to the holiday season, whereas during 'off-peak' times such as winters, low prices are charged. 'Off-peak' pricing makes the term 'cheap-holiday' come to life as it encourages ticket sales at times where these parks experience a fall in demand, resulting in a win-win situation for both parties involved.

Brands and dynamic pricing
In recent years, more brands have launched direct-to-consumer sales channels to capture more consumer data and control brand perception. Many brands turn to dynamic pricing to help manage this sales channel and follow the market.

With dynamic pricing, brands can more easily control their market perception and create a direct relationship with consumers. However, the most interesting benefit of a direct-to-consumer strategy is the market data that brands can collect on their customers.

Some third-party sellers in the Amazon Marketplace use software to change prices more frequently than would be feasible for people to do, in order to compete for business on price.

Dynamic pricing methods 
There are a number of ways to execute a pricing strategy with dynamic pricing software, and they can all be combined to match any commercial strategy. This section details some of the most well-known and popular pricing methods and explains how they change in a dynamic pricing engine. These pricing mechanisms are from the seller's point of view and not the consumer's point of view, meaning that the seller plays an active role in the price setting due to the assumption of high bargaining power of sellers.

Cost-plus pricing
Cost-plus pricing is the most basic method of pricing. A store will simply charge consumers the cost required to produce a product plus a predetermined amount of profit.

Cost-plus pricing is simple to execute, but it only considers internal information when setting the price and does not factor in external influencers like market reactions, the weather, or changes in consumer value. A dynamic pricing tool can make it easier to update prices, but will not make the updates often if the user doesn't account for external information like competitor market prices.

Due to its simplicity, this is the most widely used method of pricing with around 74% of companies in the United States employing this dynamic pricing strategy. Although widely used, the usage is skewed, with companies facing a high degree of competition using this strategy the most, on the other hand, companies that deal with manufacturing tend to use this strategy the least.

Pricing based on competitors
Businesses that want to price competitively will monitor their competitors’ prices and adjust accordingly. This is called competitor-based pricing. In retail, the competitor that many companies watch is Amazon, which changes prices frequently throughout the day. Amazon is a market leader in retail that changes prices often, which encourages other retailers to alter their prices to stay competitive. Such online retailers use price-matching mechanisms. The retailers give the end-user an option for the same, and upon selecting the option to price match, an online bot searches for the lowest price across various websites and offers a price lower than the lowest.

Such pricing behavior depends on market conditions, as well as a firm's planning. Although a firm existing within a highly competitive market is compelled to cut prices, that is not always the case. In case of high competition, yet a stable market, and a long-term view, it was predicted that firms will tend to cooperate on a price basis rather than undercut each other. It needs to be pointed out that the three conditions are necessary in the case of firms deciding to forego competitive pricing.

Pricing based on value or elasticity
Ideally, companies should ask the price for a product that is equal to the value a consumer attaches to a product. This is called value-based pricing. As this value can differ from person to person, it is difficult to uncover the perfect value and have a differentiated price for every person. However, consumers' willingness to pay can be used as a proxy for the perceived value. With the price elasticity of products, companies can calculate how many consumers are willing to pay for the product at each price point. Products with high elasticities are highly sensitive to changes in price, while products with low elasticities are less sensitive to price changes (ceteris paribus). Subsequently, products with low elasticity are typically valued more by consumers if everything else is equal. The dynamic aspect of this pricing method is that elasticities change with respect to the product, category, time, location, and retailers. With the price elasticity of products and the margin of the product, retailers can use this method with their pricing strategy to aim for volume, revenue, or profit maximization strategies.

Bundle pricing 
There are two types of bundle pricing strategies: one from the consumer's point of view, and one from the seller's point of view. From the seller's point of view,   an end product's price depends on whether it is bundled with something else; which bundle it belongs to; and sometimes on which customers it is offered to. This strategy is adopted by print-media houses and other subscription-based services. The Wall Street Journal, for example, offers a standalone price if an electronic mode of delivery is purchased, and a discount when it is bundled with print delivery. Software companies and music-streaming sites offer student discounts as part of their bundle-pricing tactics.

Time-based dynamic pricing
Time-based dynamic pricing is popular in industries in which demand changes throughout the day or where suppliers want to offer customers an incentive to use a product at a certain time of day.

Time-based retail pricing
Many industries, especially online retailers, change prices depending on the time of day. Most retail customers shop during weekly office hours (between 9 AM and 5 PM), so many retailers will raise prices during the morning and afternoon, then lower prices during the evening.

Time-based utility pricing
Time-based pricing of services such as provision of electric power includes:
 Time-of-use pricing (TOU pricing), whereby electricity prices are set for a specific time period on an advance or forward basis, typically not changing more often than twice a year. Prices paid for energy consumed during these periods are pre-established and known to consumers in advance, allowing them to vary their usage in response to such prices and manage their energy costs by shifting usage to a lower-cost period, or reducing their consumption overall (demand response)
 Critical peak pricing, whereby time-of-use prices are in effect except for certain peak days, when prices may reflect the costs of generating and/or purchasing electricity at the wholesale level.
 Real-time pricing, whereby electricity prices may change as often as hourly (exceptionally more often). Prices may be signaled to a user on an advanced or forward basis, reflecting the utility's cost of generating and/or purchasing electricity at the wholesale level; and
 Peak-load reduction credits, for consumers with large loads who enter into pre-established peak-load-reduction agreements that reduce a utility's planned capacity obligations.
Peak fit pricing is best used for products that are inelastic in supply, where suppliers are fully able to anticipate demand growth and thus be able to charge differently for service during systematic periods of time.

A utility with regulated prices may develop a time-based pricing schedule on analysis of its long-run costs, such as operation and investment costs. A utility such as electricity (or another service), operating in a market environment, may be auctioned on a competitive market; time-based pricing will typically reflect price variations on the market. Such variations include both regular oscillations due to the demand patterns of users; supply issues (such as availability of intermittent natural resources like water flow or wind); and exceptional price peaks.

Price peaks reflect strained conditions in the market (possibly augmented by market manipulation, as during the California electricity crisis), and convey a possible lack of investment. Extreme events include the default by Griddy after the 2021 Texas power crisis.

Conversion-rate pricing
Conversion rates measure how many browsers on a website turn into buyers. When conversion rates of viewers to buyers are low, dropping the price to increase conversions is standard with a dynamic pricing strategy.

A good conversion rate means a good ROI. If your conversion rate decreases, the ROI will also decrease, and the cost of conversion will increase, which is when you need to change your marketing strategy.

Controversy
Some critics of dynamic pricing, also known as 'surge pricing', say it is a form of price gouging. Dynamic pricing is widely unpopular among consumers as some feel it tends to favour particular buyers. While the intent of surge pricing is generally driven by demand-supply dynamics, some instances have proven otherwise. Internet giants have suffered severe backlash for their dynamic pricing practices, including:

Amazon.com

Amazon.com engaged in price discrimination for some customers in the year 2000, showing different prices at the same time for the same item to different customers, potentially violating the Robinson–Patman Act. When this incident became public knowledge, Amazon issued an apology but did not cease the practice.

During the COVID-19 pandemic, prices of certain items in high demand were reported to shoot up by quadruple their original price, garnering negative attention. Although Amazon denied claims of any such manipulation and blamed a few sellers for shooting up prices for essentials such as sanitizers and masks, prices of essential products 'sold by Amazon' had also seen a hefty rise in prices. Amazon claimed this was a result of software malfunction.

Uber
Uber's surge pricing has also created controversy. In 2013, when New York was in the midst of a storm, Uber users saw fares go up eight times the usual fares. This incident attracted public backlash from even celebrities, with Salman Rushdie amongst others publicly criticising this move. 

After this incident, the company started placing caps on how high surge pricing can go during times of emergency, starting in 2015.

Drivers have been known to hold off on accepting rides in an area until surge pricing forces fares up to a level satisfactory to them.

Coca Cola

As the largest beverage company in the world, Coca-Cola sells nearly 20,000 bottles of Coca-Cola every second. Dynamic pricing is unacceptable to consumers.
In 1999, Coca-Cola launched a new interactive vending machine that can detect the surrounding temperature, and the price of Coca-Cola in the vending machine will be more expensive when the temperature is higher. The incident sparked reports in The New York Times and others. From a customer perspective, it would no longer be considered fair that the weather would be hotter and pay more.

Price discrimination, where prices may be higher all year round in warm countries and lower in countries with cooler average temperatures. Sales in warmer countries are likely to fall. Price discrimination can harm Coca-Cola's brand image.

See also
Hedonic regression
Pay what you want
Price discrimination
Price gouging
Variable pricing
Demand shaping

References

External links
 In Praise of Efficient Price Gouging (2014-08-19), MIT Technology Review

Pricing
Economics of regulation
Economics and time